William Blackett may refer to:

Sir William Blackett, 1st Baronet, of Newcastle (1620–1680), English merchant and MP
Sir William Blackett, 1st Baronet, of Newcastle-upon-Tyne (1657–1705), English MP, son of the above
Sir William Blackett, 2nd Baronet (1690–1728), English MP, son of the above
Sir William Blackett, 5th Baronet (1759–1816), British baronet

See also
Blackett (surname)